Robin Smith may refer to:

Robin Smith (bishop) (born 1936), Bishop of Hertford, 1990–2001
Robin Smith (chess player) (1952–2009), American chess player
Robin Smith (climber) (1938–1962), British climber
Robin Smith (comics) (fl. 1980–2005), British comic book artist
Robin Smith (cricketer) (born 1963), South African-born England international cricketer
Robin Smith (politician) (born 1963), member of the Tennessee House of Representatives
Robin Smith (racing driver) (born 1943), British racing driver
Robin Smith (wrestler) (born 1964), American WWF performer
Robin B. Smith (born 1955), South African wrestling manager and actor
Robin Smith (reporter), St. Louis news anchor

See also
 Robyn Smith (disambiguation)